The 1949–50 Klass B season was the third season of the Klass B, the second level of ice hockey in the Soviet Union. 19 teams participated in the league, and HC Spartak Minsk won the championship and was promoted to the Soviet Championship League.

First round

Zone 1

Zone 2

Zone 3

Final tournament

External links
 Season on hockeyarchives.info

2
Soviet Union
Ice hockey leagues in the Soviet Union